Clark Station may refer to:

 Clark Station, Louisville, a neighborhood in Louisville, Kentucky
 Clark/Lake station, a rapid transit station in Chicago
 Clark/Division station, a rapid transit station in Chicago
 Clark station (CTA), a closed rapid transit station in Chicago